The Holy Order of the Cherubim and Seraphim Movement Church is an Aladura church originating from Nigeria. It is one of the first African initiated churches established back in 1925 with its founder known to be Baba Aladura St. Moses Orimolade Tunolase. The church was born out of the Anglican Church community among the Yoruba people in Western Nigeria.

It is very active in Europe and the United States. It was founded in the 20th  century. It has its headquarters in Orile Igbon in Oyo State Nigeria.

References

See also 
Christianity in Nigeria
Cherubim and Seraphim Church of Zion
Cherubim and Seraphim Society
Eternal Sacred Order of Cherubim and Seraphim

Churches in Nigeria
African initiated churches